Ken Ward (born 30 September 1935) is a former Australian rules footballer who played with Richmond in the Victorian Football League (VFL).

Notes

External links 		
		
		
		
		
		
		
Living people		
1935 births		
Australian rules footballers from Victoria (Australia)		
Richmond Football Club players